Steve Edwards (born Steven Edward Schwartz on August 23, 1948 in New York City) is an American retired television and radio personality in Los Angeles, California morning shows, including AM Los Angeles, Two on The Town, and Good Day L.A..  From 2001-05, he hosted GDLA's nationally-syndicated companion show, Good Day Live, which aired on many Fox-owned and affiliated stations.  Currently he is a regular fill-in host at KABC radio as well as hosting 2 podcasts, OK LA, with former co-hosts Jillian Barberie and Dorothy Lucey, from Good Day LA and Steve Edwards Confessions: an in-depth interview with newsmakers and people who have impacted our culture.

Biography

Edwards began his broadcasting career after graduating from the University of Miami (earning a degree in history) and attending the University of Houston (unfinished work on a master's degree in clinical psychology). His first broadcasting job was in the late 1960s with KMSC radio (now KMJQ) in the Houston suburb of Clear Lake City, Texas. He later moved to KTRH, where he hosted a nighttime call-in show. While in Houston, he also worked at CBS television affiliate KHOU-TV, where he was a news anchor and hosted shows. In the mid-1970s, he worked at ABC-owned WLS-TV in Chicago as host of AM Chicago with Sandi Freeman and Friday Night with Steve Edwards.

In 1978, Edwards moved to Los Angeles, where he worked at CBS-owned KNXT (later KCBS-TV), in which he hosted daily half hour magazine style Two On the Town with Connie Chung and later Melody Rogers, and his own self-titled talk show. While at the station, he served as its entertainment editor and as a weatherman. He also worked on The Baxters, an experimental sitcom produced by Norman Lear, and was lead host on the variety show On Stage America.

Edwards appeared as a correspondent Entertainment Tonight for one season, and moved to KABC-TV in 1984. At KABC-TV, he hosted A.M. Los Angeles, first with Cristina Ferrare followed by Tawny Little, along with Hollywood Closeup and an afternoon show, 3:30. Edwards also hosted  talk radio programs for then-radio sister station KABC-AM, with both the Steve Edwards Show and Sports Talk.

Edwards returned to local television in 1993, when he began hosting Live in L.A., an infotainment program on KCAL-TV, before becoming an anchor and host of Fox-owned KTTV's Good Day L.A. in 1995.

Through the years Edwards has been the host of many unsold pilots including game shows, variety shows and talk shows.  Three game show pilots featuring Edwards as host included Get Rich Quick! in 1977 for Bob Stewart and ABC, Pandemonium in 1979 for Jay Wolpert and CBS, and a 1990 pilot of a potential syndication run of the mid-80s NBC game show Scrabble.  Neither of these three pilots were picked up.

Dismissal
KTTV announced on December 11, 2017 that Edwards "is no longer employed" by the station amid sexual harassment allegations.  His dismissal came during the height of the #MeToo movement.

Awards and honors
Edwards has received the Governor's Award from the Academy of Television Arts & Sciences and has a star on the Hollywood Walk of Fame.

References

External links
Steve Edwards' FoxLA bio at Internet Wayback Machine

Living people
American infotainers
American television talk show hosts
Television anchors from Los Angeles
1948 births
Journalists from New York City